Castelo de Porto de Mós is a castle in Portugal. It is classified as a National Monument.

Porto de Mos
Castle Porto Mos
Castle Porto Mos